Murder in Canton is a gong'an detective novel written by Robert van Gulik and set in Imperial China (roughly speaking the Tang Dynasty). It is a fiction based on the real character of Judge Dee (Ti Jen-chieh or Di Renjie), a magistrate and statesman of the Tang court, who lived roughly 630–700.

The book contains twelve illustrations and a map of Canton by the author.

Plot introduction
Judge Dee is now the most senior judge in all of China and his authority is little less than that of the Emperor himself. Canton is the most important trading port in the country, filled with merchants from many other lands, some as far away as India and Baghdad. When one of the secretive but very powerful Imperial censors goes missing in Canton, Judge Dee must come to the city in disguise and investigate. He is aided by a beautiful blind girl who collects crickets.

This is the last story in the internal chronology of Judge Dee.

Literary significance and criticism
"Published in the year before his death, this tale by the distinguished Sinologist takes Judge Dee to a setting new for him and deals with crime in a style closer to that of his first good ones. The unraveling of the political intrigue and love affairs is as subtle as the plot is complex, and modernity and antiquity are beautifully blended. As in all the other stories, the illustrations are too much alike to add much interest".

References

1966 novels
Judge Dee
Gong'an novels
Heinemann (publisher) books
Historical mystery novels